The Icon Derelict DeSoto is a one-off rat rod, modified from a standard 1952 Chrysler Town & Country by ICON. It uses a Chrysler Hemi V8 engine, and features the front end from a DeSoto.

Specification 
The Derelict DeSoto was originally built as a Chrysler Town & Country Wagon in 1952, but was rebuilt by Icon into a rat rod as part of their Derelict line. The car features the front end from a 1952 DeSoto sedan, whilst it retains the Town & Country's original rear end. The standard Chrysler Hemi V8 engine was replaced by a 6.1-litre,  SRT Hemi V8, as used in the Dodge Challenger SRT-8; a 6-speed automatic transmission was also fitted.

Reception 
Hot Rod Magazine tested the car in April 2011, and were generally positive. They praised the car's reliability and driveability, although David Freiburger criticized the placement of the fly-by-wire throttle, and both testers criticized the cupholders. In 2012, it was featured on an episode of Jay Leno's Garage.

References

External links

1950s cars
2010s cars
Chrysler vehicles
DeSoto vehicles
Station wagons